Robichaud is a French surname. Notable people with the surname include:

Adrian Robichaud, heavy metal bass guitarist from Toronto, Ontario, Canada
Albany Robichaud (1903–1974), Progressive Conservative party member of the Canadian House of Commons
Audrey Robichaud (born 1988), Canadian athlete
Carmel Robichaud, politician and retired teacher in New Brunswick, Canada
Edith Hacon or Robichaud (1875–1952) married Canadian soldier (William), Scottish suffragist from Dornoch, a World War One nursing volunteer, as well as an international socialite
Elvy Robichaud (born 1951), former Canadian politician
Fernand Robichaud, PC (born 1939), Canadian politician
Gary Robichaud (1962–2005), Canadian teacher and politician
Hédard Robichaud, PC, OC (1911–1999), Acadian-Canadian MP, Cabinet member, Senator and Lieutenant Governor of New Brunswick
Jean George Robichaud (1883–1969), fish merchant and political figure in New Brunswick
Jocelyn Robichaud (born 1978), former tour professional tennis player
Louis Robichaud, PC, CC, QC (1925–2005), Canadian lawyer and politician
Louis-Prudent-Alexandre Robichaud (1890–1971), New Brunswick political figure and jurist
Paul Robichaud (born 1964), politician in the province of New Brunswick, Canada
Serge Robichaud, Canadian politician

See also

Robichaud v. Canada (Treasury Board)
 
 Robichaux
 Robicheau
 Robicheaux